The Global Water Foundation (GWF) is a non-profit organisation dedicated to delivering clean water and sanitation to the world's neediest communities. Retired professional tennis player Johan Kriek founded the organisation in 2005 after attending meetings of the World Economic Forum in Cape Town, South Africa. The goals of the GWF echo the Millennium Development Goals established at the United Nations' Millennium Summit in September 2000.

Headquartered in Johannesburg, South Africa, with offices in Sarasota, Florida, and Raleigh, North Carolina, in the United States, the GWF's goal is to raise public awareness, contribute technical assistance and fund programs to improve water quality and provide adequate sanitation in schools, rural areas and other communities across developing nations.

Tennis legends John McEnroe, Martina Navratilova, Jim Courier, and other sports superstars including Olympic swimmers Aaron Peirsol, Janet Evans, Kate Ziegler and Tara Kirk have pledged their support to serve as Clean Water Ambassadors to deliver the Global Water Foundation's message to a worldwide audience.



Overview 
The Global Water Foundation was set up as a charitable trust with the exclusive purpose of the trust being to raise public awareness, provide technical assistance, support knowledge sharing, support technical innovation and research and facilitate the provision of humanitarian aid throughout the developing world, with the ultimate goal of providing safe, healthy, drinking water and adequate sanitation in areas where it is not available or where accessibility and water supply have been compromised.

The GWF is in the service of humanity: to help make the world a better place, a healthier place, a safer place and ultimately a place of peace and prosperity. All projects and programs funded by the GWF have the same goal: to make the world a better place for all.

Projects 
The GWF completed their first project in 2006 in the Kamuli District in eastern Uganda. The GWF addressed grave water problems at the 983-student Ndolwa Parents School in the town of Budiope, northeast of the capital. The project was so successful that it quickly expanded outward from the school grounds and today serves the surrounding area of 15,000 people with clean water.

The GWF worked with skilled contractors and members of the community to drill a borehole and install a Mono Pumps Solar Pumping System. This self-contained system stores water in a 2,600 gallon holding tank and is solar-powered, providing maximum water output without relying on fuel that drives up costs. The funds needed to drill the borehole and install the solar pump were approximately US$50,000.

Currently, the GWF is working with the Rotary International to repair a broken pipeline in Manta, Ecuador. The pipeline was destroyed by an El Niño storm, leaving more than 1,700 children and families in the surrounding villages of San Juan, Santa Marianita, San Jose and San Ramon without regular access to clean water. Since the pipeline break, these villages receive clean water by truck once every two weeks at best.

To raise funds for this project, the GWF teamed up with the International Tennis Group (ITG) and the Rotary Club of Naples to host an Ecuadorian Evening during the Association of Tennis Professionals ATP Challenger Series on 28 April 2007 at the Naples Tennis Club. Mayor of Manta Jorge Zambrano attended the event, which featured a dinner of Ecuadorian fare and live and silent auctions.

The project is currently underway and expected to complete work by early 2008.

Awareness 
The Global Water Foundation understands the need to raise public awareness of the importance of clean water. A public service announcement and call to action from Johan Kriek can be found on YouTube. The GWF is also reaching out younger audiences through popular social networking communities such as MySpace and Facebook.

In addition to the GWF's Web site, the organisation opened a Virtual Education Center in the online community Second Life. The Virtual Education Center showcases photos from the GWF's work in Uganda, as well as, important facts about water. The office is complete with a sitting area and free GWF T-shirts for visitors.

Celebrity ambassadors 
Celebrities who have become ambassadors for the GWF include:

Amanda Beard
Jim Courier
Kevin Curren
Janet Evans
Brendan Hansen
Cullen Jones
Tara Kirk 
Henri LeConte
John McEnroe
Martina Navratilova
Aaron Peirsol
Kate Ziegler

References

External links 
Global Water Foundation – Official Web site
Global Water Foundation Drives Major School Project in Uganda with the Help of Olympians – World Olympians Association

Water-related charities
Foundations based in South Africa
Development charities based in South Africa
Organisations based in Johannesburg
Environmental organizations established in 2005
2005 establishments in South Africa